Bill Oughton was a wheelchair rugby player from New Zealand, and a member of the national team, the Wheel Blacks.

Bill competed for the Wheel Blacks at two Paralympic Games, winning a medal in each.  First he won a bronze medal in the 2000 Summer Paralympics becoming New Zealand Paralympian #129, before being part of the gold medal-winning team in 2004.

Bill passed away on 31 December 2022. He is survived by wife Michelle and his twin sons Jack and Pete.

References

External links 
 
 

Paralympic wheelchair rugby players of New Zealand
Wheelchair rugby players at the 2000 Summer Paralympics
Wheelchair rugby players at the 2004 Summer Paralympics
Paralympic gold medalists for New Zealand
Paralympic bronze medalists for New Zealand
Living people
Medalists at the 2000 Summer Paralympics
Medalists at the 2004 Summer Paralympics
Year of birth missing (living people)
Paralympic medalists in wheelchair rugby